The Robertson Oval is a multi-use sports facility in Wagga Wagga, New South Wales,  Australia. It primarily hosts cricket, Australian rules football and rugby league matches. A grass embankment runs around three-quarters of the oval with a 350-seat grandstand and social club on western side of the ground. Plans are in place for a 3–5 million dollar redevelopment of the arena. As the oval is located in the heart of Wagga Wagga CBD, the AFL and New South Wales Cricket Association will use the oval after redevelopment preferring it to other regional venues.

Teams
Wagga Tigers - Aussie Rules, Riverina Football League
Hosts matches for various teams from the Wagga Cricket League

NOTE: The playing surface is currently too small to host top-class cricket and AFL matches, something the redevelopment will address.

History

A cricket match between Wagga Wagga and an Australian XI on 8 March 1878 is the first recorded First-Grade cricket match at the Robertson Oval. 22 men of Wagga Wagga took on 11 Australians in a two-day match. The Australians, under their first captain, Dave Gregory won by an innings and 117 runs. The match was played in preparation for the 1878 Tour to England.

The ground was the venue for a Sheffield Shield game between New South Wales and Victoria from February 15 to 18, 2015, due to the unavailability of the Sydney Cricket Ground during the 2015 World Cup.

The city will also host under-14 State Challenge matches in 2016 and 2017 and there will be funding set aside to help develop cricket at a grassroots level too.

The Australians scorecard is noted below:

Fall of Wickets:
1-? (C Bannerman), 2-? (AC Bannerman), 3-21 (Horan), 4-42 (Bailey), 5-98 (Gregory), 6-202 (Garrett), 7-253 (Blackham), 8-260 (Murdoch), 9-260 (Allan, 162.3 ov)

Attendance records
11,000 in 1960 for an International Rugby league match (France 25 beat Riverina 14)
10,732 in 1954 for an International Rugby League match between Great Britain and a Riverina Invitational side. Great Britain were on a gruelling tour of Australia and New Zealand of over three months, including 32 matches. The British, captained by Willie Horne won narrowly 36–26. Great Britain would later go on to win the inaugural Rugby League World Cup, in France, later that year.

Notable cricket matches

References

Sports venues in New South Wales
Cricket grounds in New South Wales
Rugby league stadiums in Australia
Australian rules football grounds
World Series Cricket venues
Sport in Wagga Wagga
Sports venues completed in 1878
North East Australian Football League grounds